Glory Onome Nathaniel (born 23 January 1996) is a Nigerian athlete specialising in the 400 metres hurdles. She represented her country at the 2017 World Championships reaching the semifinals. Additionally, she won three silver medals at the 2017 Islamic Solidarity Games.

Onome studied Human Kinetics Department at Tai Solarin University of Education (TASUED). She got enlisted on the Institution Hall of Fame when she made the Top 21 list of Students That Shaped TASUED In 2016/17.

Her personal bests are 55.30 seconds in the 400 metres hurdles (London 2017) and 52.24	seconds in the 400 metres (Abuja 2017).

International competitions

1Disqualified in the semifinals

References

1996 births
Living people
Nigerian female hurdlers
World Athletics Championships athletes for Nigeria
Commonwealth Games medallists in athletics
Commonwealth Games silver medallists for Nigeria
Athletes (track and field) at the 2018 Commonwealth Games
Sportspeople from Delta State
African Championships in Athletics winners
Islamic Solidarity Games competitors for Nigeria
21st-century Nigerian women
Medallists at the 2018 Commonwealth Games